Scott Kim is an American puzzle and video game designer, artist, and author of Korean descent. He started writing an occasional "Boggler" column for Discover magazine in 1990, and became an exclusive columnist in 1999, and created hundreds of other puzzles for magazines such as Scientific American and Games, as well as thousands of puzzles for computer games. He was the holder of the Harold Keables chair at Iolani School in 2008.

Kim was born in 1955 in Washington D.C. and grew up in Rolling Hills Estates, California. He had an early interest in mathematics, education, and art, and attended Stanford University, receiving a BA in music, and a PhD in Computers and Graphic Design under Donald Knuth. In 1981, he created a book called Inversions, words that can be read in more than one way.  His first puzzles appeared in Scientific American in Martin Gardner's
"Mathematical Games" column and he said that the column inspired his own career as a puzzle designer.
 
Kim is one of the best-known masters of the art of ambigrams.

Kim designed logos for Silicon Graphics, Inc., GOES, The Hackers Conference, the Computer Game Developers Conference, and Dylan.

Kim is a regular speaker on puzzle design, such as at the International Game Developers Conference and Casual Games Conference. His wife, Amy Jo Kim, is the author of Community Building on the Web.

He lives in Burlingame, California with his wife Amy Jo Kim, son Gabriel and daughter Lila Rose.

Works 
 Inversions, 1981, Byte Books, a book of 60 original ambigrams
 "Letterforms & Illusion", 1989, W. H. Freeman & Co., created with Robin Samelson, accompanies the book, Inversions.
 Quintapaths, 1969 (tiling puzzle), published by Kadon since 1999.
 Heaven and Earth, Buena Vista / Disney (computer game)
 Obsidian, SegaSoft (computer game)
 MetaSquares, 1996 (computer game, created with Kai Krause, Phil Clevenger, and Ian Gilman).
 The Next Tetris, Hasbro Interactive, PlayStation
 Railroad Rush Hour, ThinkFun (toy)
 Charlie Blast's Territory (Nintendo 64 game)
 The NewMedia Puzzle Workout - collection of Kim's magazine puzzles
 Scott Kim's Puzzle Box (monthly Shockwave puzzles at JuniorNet.com)
 Brainteasers, Mind Benders, Games, Word Searches, Puzzlers, Mazes & More Calendar 2007, Workman Publishing Company,

Contributed works 
 Harry Abrams. Escher Interactive (computer game)	 
 Elonka Dunin, The Mammoth Book of Secret Code Puzzles, 2006, Constable & Robinson, 
 Popcap Games, Bejeweled 2, design of Puzzle Mode puzzles

References

 Neurology Now. Biographical article from 2009.
 Scott Kim: Puzzlemaster - Kim's website
 Dan Burstein, Secrets of Angels & Demons, 2004, CDS Books. 
 Discover magazine "Boggler" column. (archived copies, 1999-2002)
 Susan Lammers, Programmers at Work (Microsoft Press, 1986), 272-285. Interview with Kim.
 TED Talks video - at the Entertainment Gathering Conference 2008

1955 births
American male writers
American writers of Korean descent
American video game designers
Living people
Puzzle designers
Recreational mathematicians
Mathematics popularizers
Toy inventors
Stanford University alumni
People from Rolling Hills Estates, California